Godar Pir-e Sofla (also Romanized as Godār Pīr-e Soflá; also known as Godārpey-ye Soflá) is a village in Sar Firuzabad Rural District, Firuzabad District, Kermanshah County, Kermanshah Province, Iran. At the 2006 census, its population was 201, in 35 families.

References 

Populated places in Kermanshah County